Larne Grammar School is a co-educational voluntary grammar school located in Larne, County Antrim, Northern Ireland. Founded in 1886 by Sir Edward Coey and John Crawford, it has around 760 pupils and 50 teaching staff.

History

The school was opened by Mr. John Crawford and Sir Edward Coey in 1887. Mr. R.M. Jones M.A. opened the school to its first pupils. Larne Grammar School was set up as an all boys fee paying and boarding school. During the school's first 20 years, very few pupils attended, and the school was threatened to be closed on numerous occasions. The school temporarily closed between 1914 and 1918 due to the outbreak of World War One. In 1922, Larne Grammar School merged with Larne Girls' School, and a Preparatory Department was established. Larne Grammar began to grow, with more and more pupils joining the voluntary school. During the early 1970s, the school was extended to accommodate the growing number of pupils. 19 new classrooms, a sports hall and changing rooms were built to the rear of the school.  
During the leadership of Headmaster D.J. Thompson, the original school building was demolished and replaced by a new school in 1987. 22 new classrooms, a new sports hall, new staff offices and a new canteen were built, as well as a new atrium, reception and Headmaster Suite. The extension from 1972 remained, but was refurbished. The original assembly hall was retained and still remains today.
In 2001, under the command of John Wilson, a new Technology and Design Department was established. The new building consists of two classrooms with workshops, offices and lavatories. The building has solar panels and provides all of the energy required to power the entire school. Furthermore, a new Music Department was constructed towards the rear of the building, with a large classroom, offices and tuition rooms. To celebrate the 125th Anniversary of Larne Grammar School, a new astro-turf hockey pitch, four tennis courts and a new pavilion were built.
All classrooms have been fully refurbished during the 2012/13 school year, with new equipment being added such as Apple Computers, new desks and new chairs; all of which under the orders of new Headmaster Jonathan Wylie.

Academics
The school was inspected in November 2000 by the Department of Education. The following strengths were identified:
 Exemplary behaviour and motivation of the pupils
 Many instances of good teaching
 High standards achieved by many of the pupils
 Good accommodation.

With J Wilson as headmaster, the school flourished with pupils gaining an overall excellent standard of teaching with GCSE and A Level grades much higher than the Northern Ireland average, which has the highest average throughout the UK.
To enroll at the school, pupils go through several selection processes to ensure that all pupils have a high academic standard.

Curriculum

Bold subjects are compulsory

Bold subjects are compulsory

Teaching Staff
Larne Grammar School has 60 teachers and 772 pupils, giving the school a pupil teacher ratio of 12.7 pupils per teacher, which is much lower than the Northern Ireland average of 15.6 for Grammar Schools, and 16.8 for all schools delivering secondary education.

All subjects have at least two teachers, with many having more. All teachers are able to teach at least one subject to A level, with many able to do so with two subjects.

Extracurricular activities

Department of Music
Orchestra
Woodwind Group
Brass Group
String Group
Traditional Irish Group
Jazz Band
Music Theory Club
Music Appreciation Society
Junior Choir
Senior Choir
Chamber Choir
Choral Group
Music Lessons in the following instruments;
-Brass:Trumpet, Cornet, E-Flat Tenor, French Horn, Horn, Baritone, Euphonium, Tuba, Trumbone
-Woodwind: Clarinet, Flute, Saxophone
-String: Violin, Viola, Cello, Double Bass
-Percussion: Drum Kit, Side Drum
-Other: Guitar, Piano, Voice

Department of Physical Education and Sport
Rugby
Hockey
Badminton Club
Tennis Club
Netball Club
Volleyball Club
Basketball Club
Rowing Club
Dance and Fitness Club
Dance Club
Fitness Club
Cross Country Club
Athletics Club
Walking Club
Yoga Club

Department of the Environment
Conservation Society

English Department
Club of Literature
Debating Society
Drama Club
Junior Reading Club
Senior Reading Club

Modern Languages Department
French Club
Spanish Club

Technology and Design Department
Remote Control Car Club

Other
Charity Committee
Chess Club
Homework Club
Photography Club

Sport

Hockey
In 2000, the School won the Ulster Senior Schoolgirls' Hockey Cup, an annual competition competed for by schools affiliated to the Ulster Women's Hockey Union, by beating Ballymena Academy 2–1 in the final. 

In 2022, the school's 1st XI Hockey Team were crowned Super League 'Tier B' Champions following a final against Grosvenor Grammar School, where Larne Grammar School won 3-0.

Rugby

The 1st XV have reached the final of the Subsidiary Shield competition of the Ulster Schools Cup on three occasions in 1981, 1991 and 1992, but lost on each occasion.

On 9 March 2007, the 1st XV rugby team won the Schools Trophy by beating Omagh Academy 11–3 in the final. They won it again on 22 February 2008, beating Dalriada 12–0 in the final.

At junior level, the school Medallion XV were finalists in the Medallion Shield in 1955. The team won the subsidiary Medallion Plate in 1987 and were runners up in the Plate in 1998 and 1999. The lowest of the subsidiary competitions, the Medallion Trophy, was won in 2008 when Downshire High School were narrowly defeated by 13–12 in the final.

Athletics

In the summer of 2008, the school senior boys 4 × 100 m team qualified from the Ulster heats to reach the All Ireland School Athletics Finals. The team won the title in a time of 43.67 seconds, less than a tenth ahead of second place Castleknock College.	
 In 2009 the team retained the title, making them only the 6th school to ever do so.

Notable former pupils

 Dr Norman Apsley, Chief Executive of the Catalyst Inc
 Dianne Barr, Paralympic gold medalist
 Stafford Carson, former Moderator of the Presbyterian Church in Ireland
 Dave Clements, footballer and football manager
 William Craig, politician
 Frederick Girvan, Justice of the High Court of Northern Ireland and member of the Privy Council
 Robert John Gregg, Pioneer of the academic study of Ulster-Scots dialects as well as a linguistic authority on Canadian English
 Mark Haggan, Charity activist and businessman
 Sir John Hermon Chief Constable of the Royal Ulster Constabulary
 Stephen Hilditch, former Headmaster of Belfast High School and former international rugby union referee from 1984 to 1995.
 Gareth McAuley. Professional Footballer
 Ayeisha McFerran, Irish Hockey International 
 Emma McIlroy, Founder and CEO of the Wildfang fashion brand
 James McIlroy, British Olympian
 Phillip Magee, X Factor series 2 finalist
 Gareth Maybin, professional golfer
 Julie Nelson, International Footballer
 Jonathan Rea, motorcycle racer
 Trevor Ringland, former British and Irish Lions international rugby player, Northern Irish politician, and co-chairman of the NI Conservatives.
 Professor Sir Terence Stephenson consultant paediatrician at UCL and chair of the General Medical Council
 Raymond Snoddy, journalist and media commentator
 Claire Taggart, British Paralympian and Boccia World Champion
 Professor David Williams, astrochemist at University College London

References

External links 
 Official site

Grammar schools in County Antrim
Schools in Larne
Educational institutions established in 1886
Larne
Buildings and structures in Larne
1886 establishments in Ireland